The White Crow is a 1980 Soviet drama film directed by Valeriy Lonskoy.

Plot 
The miner Yegor goes on holiday to the south, and there meets the married Sonya, an encounter which changes both their lives.

Cast 
 Vladimir Gostyukhin		
 Irina Dymchenko
 Aleksandr Mikhaylov
 Irina Akulova
 Lev Borisov
 Boris Shcherbakov		
 Vladimir Zemlyanikin	
 Viktor Filippov
 Roman Khomyatov
 Lyubov Polishchuk

References

External links 
 

1980 films
1980s Russian-language films
Soviet drama films
Mosfilm films
1980 drama films